Valdemar Magnusson (c. after 1282 – 1318) was a Swedish prince, heir to the throne of Sweden, and Duke of Finland.

Background
Valdemar was the third son of Magnus III and Helvig of Holstein. He became Duke of Finland in 1302 at the coronation of his older brother, Birger. Valdemar married Kristina Torgilsdotter, daughter of Torgils Knutsson, who was the constable and virtual ruler of Sweden during King Birger's early reign.

Political career
Valdemar's father-in-law, Torkel Knutsson, was arrested in December 1305 and executed the following February. Valdemar subsequently divorced his wife, claiming that they were spiritually related (baptism siblings) because Torkel was his godfather. In the fall of 1312 in Oslo, he married Ingeborg, daughter of King Eirik II of Norway. It was a double wedding, because at the same time Valdemar's brother Eric married Ingeborg, daughter of King Haakon V of Norway. Valdemar and Ingeborg had a son in 1316 who died as a child.

In 1306, in an event known as the Håtuna games (Håtunaleken), King Birger was captured by his brothers on the Håtuna royal estate in Uppland and taken as prisoner to Nyköping Castle (Nyköpingshus). Two years later, King Eric VI of Denmark forced Valdemar and Eric to release King Birger under humiliating conditions. King Birger sought aid in Denmark after his release and the strife resumed.

By 1315, Valdemar and Eric had managed to wrest large parts of the Swedish kingdom from their brother. Valdemar had gained Turku and Häme castles, with a lion's share of Finland, the castle of Stockholm, most of Uppland, Borgholm castle, and the island of Öland. Eric was in possession of Kungahälla (which he had been given during his exile by the Norwegian king) and northern Halland, which he had been given by King Eric VI of Denmark.

Death 
On 10 December 1317, Valdemar and Eric were captured and imprisoned by Birger at the Nyköping Banquet (Nyköpings gästabud).

Valdemar and Eric's wives assumed leadership roles after their husbands' imprisonment. On 16 April 1318, the two duchesses entered into a treaty in Kalmar with Esger Juul, Archbishop of Lund and Christopher, brother of Eric VI of Denmark and Duke of Halland-Samsötreaty, to free their husbands.

This treaty was not honored, and their husbands died later that same year. Although their exact cause of death is unknown, the brothers are thought to have been murdered or starved to death.

The dower Ingeborg had included the island of Öland. Ingeborg was styled Duchess of Öland from at least 1340, surviving her late husband long after his death and staying in Sweden until her own death.

Ancestry

Sources
 Lindqvist, Herman Historien om Sverige. Från islossning till kungarike (Norstedts: 1997)
 Harrison, Dick Jarlens sekel: en berättelse om 1200-talets Sverige (Ordfront. 2002)
 Bergman, Mats Nyköpingshus. En rundvandring i historia och nutid (Almqvist & Wiksell. 1992)
 Mannervik, Cyrus Sagor och sägner – Från Nordens forntid och medeltid (AV Carlsons. 1958)

References

1280s births
1318 deaths
House of Bjelbo
14th-century Finnish people
14th-century Swedish people
Finnish nobility
Valdemar 1300
Deaths by starvation
Sons of kings